Jones v. Cunningham, 371 U.S. 236 (1963), was a Supreme Court case in which the court first ruled that state inmates had the right to file  a writ of habeas corpus challenging both the legality and the conditions of their imprisonment. Prior to this, starting with Pervear v. Massachusetts, 72 U.S. 475 (1866), the court had maintained a "hands off" policy regarding federal interference with state incarceration policies and practices, maintaining that the Bill of Rights did not apply to the states. Subsequently, in Cooper v. Pate (1964), an inmate successfully obtained standing to challenge the denial of his right to practice his religion through a habeas corpus writ.

References

Further reading

External links
 

United States habeas corpus case law
Cruel and Unusual Punishment Clause case law
United States Supreme Court cases
United States Supreme Court cases of the Warren Court
United States Supreme Court decisions that overrule a prior Supreme Court decision
1963 in United States case law